Necmi Mutlu (1 January 1937) is a former Turkish professional footballer and football manager. During his career, he prominently played for Beşiktaş J.K. and he also represented Turkey at international level. Mutlu spent 13 seasons at Beşiktaş until his retirement, winning the 1. Lig three times and the President Cup and Prime Minister's Cup once each.

Having played 241 games for the club, Multu holds the record for most appearances as a goalkeeper for Beşiktaş J.K.

Honours
Beşiktaş
 1. Lig (3): 1959–60, 1965–66, 1966–67
 Presidential Cup (1): 1967
 Prime Minister's Cup (1): 1974
 TSYD Cup (2): 1964–65, 1965–66

Individual
Beşiktaş J.K. Squads of Century (Silver Team)

References

External links
 Profile at TFF
 
 Profile at Beşiktaş J.K. official website. 

1937 births
Footballers from Istanbul
Association football goalkeepers
Beşiktaş J.K. footballers
Turkey international footballers
Living people
Turkish footballers